Flowerpot is a rural locality in the local government area (LGA) of Kingborough in the Hobart LGA region of Tasmania. The 2016 census recorded a population of 73 for the state suburb of Flowerpot.

History 
Flowerpot was gazetted as a locality in 1968.

Geography
The waters of the D'Entrecasteaux Channel form the eastern boundary.

Road infrastructure 
Route B68 (Channel Highway) runs through from north-east to south-east.

References

Towns in Tasmania
Localities of Kingborough Council